The Ryn Desert or Ryn-Peski Desert (Naryn-Qūmy) is a desert in western Kazakhstan and Astrakhan Oblast, Russia.

High winds sweep across the desert, and in 2001 a dust storm in the Baltic Sea was determined as originating in the Ryn Desert. A study of long-range dust transportation to the Baltic Sea region—by analyzing dust pollution in Scandinavia, showed that aerosol concentrations there were influenced more by the Ryn Desert region than the Sahara Desert in Africa.

Geography
It is located north of the Caspian Sea and southeast of the Volga Upland. The borders of the desert are very loosely defined. Some maps show the desert almost entirely within the Caspian Depression, stretching almost to the coast of the Caspian Sea, while others show it north of the depression. It lies west of the Ural River between 46° N and 49° N latitude, and 48° E to 52° E longitude.

Many small towns are scattered throughout the Ryn Desert, and population density is between 1 and 15 people per square mile. Aralsor lake lies at the northern edge. The desert lies in a semi-arid climate zone, and receives very little rainfall.

See also
 Caspian lowland desert ecoregion

References

International Journal of Environment and Pollution 2004 - Vol. 22, No.1/2  pp. 72 – 86. ISSN 0957-4352
DK World Atlas, Millennium Edition, pgs. xxv, xxix, 258 
http://www.historytoday.com/john-etty/russia%E2%80%99s-climate-and-geography

Deserts of Central Asia
Deserts of Kazakhstan
Deserts of Russia